HPB may refer to:

 Half Price Books, an American book retailer
 Harvard Papers in Botany, a scientific journal
 Health Promotion Board, a statutory board in Singapore for health promotion and disease prevention
 Helena Petrovna Blavatsky (1831–1891), theosophist, writer and traveler
 Hooper Bay Airport, in Alaska, United States (by IATA and FAA LID code)
 Hrvatska poštanska banka, largest Croatian-owned bank
 HPB (journal), journal of the International Hepato-Pancreato-Biliary Association